Azaryan or Azarian (Armenian: Ազարյան) is an Armenian and Persian surname. Notable people with the surname include:

Albert Azaryan (born 1929), Soviet Armenian artistic gymnast
Eduard Azaryan (born 1958), Soviet Armenian artistic gymnast
Krikor Azaryan (1934–2009), Bulgarian theatre director
Mary Azarian (born 1940), American woodcut artist and children's book illustrator
Mihran Azaryan (1876–1952), Ottoman Armenian and Turkish architect 
Mina Azarian (born 1959), Swedish actress
Onnik Der Azarian (1883–1935), Ottoman Armenian painter

See also 
 Azaria (disambiguation)
 Azariah (disambiguation)
 Azarias (given name)

Armenian-language surnames